Sámuel Brassai (15 June 1797 – 24 June 1897) was a Hungarian linguist and teacher sometimes called "The Last Transylvanian Polymath." In addition to being a linguist and pedagogue he was also a natural scientist, mathematician, musician, philosopher, essay writer, and a regular member of the Hungarian Academy of Sciences. He is perhaps best known for teaching methods.

Notes

References 
 É. Kiss, Katalin. 2008. A Pioneering Theory Of Information Structure. Acta Linguistica Hungarica, Vol. 55 (1–2), pp. 23–40.

External links
 

1797 births
1897 deaths
Hungarian centenarians
Men centenarians
Members of the Hungarian Academy of Sciences
People from Alba County
Rectors of the Franz Joseph University